Time War, subtitled "A Game of Time Travel and Conflict", is a science fiction board wargame published by Yaquinto Publications in 1979.

Description
Time War is a conflict simulation game which takes place from 550 million B.C. to 2075 A.D. Players attempt to control the present by altering history.

Components
22" x 28" map
 400 die-cut counters
 deck of Time Mission cards
 log pad
 two dice
 set of charts
 rule book

Reception
Don Turnbull reviewed Time War for White Dwarf #17, giving it an overall rating of 8 out of 10, and stated that "what I have seen so far indicates to me a workmanlike job, not entirely free of annoying errors and easier to learn than it looks, with plenty of play-potential and enough interest to fascinate players who like to handle a considerable number of variables at once."

Steve List reviewed Time War in Ares Magazine #1, rating it a 7 out of 9. List commented that "Time War is an excellent effort into a heretofore unexplored field, and thus many of its flaws should be excused."

Forrest Johnson reviewed Time War in The Space Gamer No. 38. Johnson commented that "Time War could have been a great game. Maybe it was ... or will be."

In Issue of 26 of Phoenix, Paul King found the game components to be of high quality, and concluded "All in all Time War is a fun game and the playing time of one or two hours is not too far out once you are used to the mechanics."

References

Board games introduced in 1979
Science fiction board wargames
Yaquinto Publications games